Tri-City Skins was an Ontario-based white power group active from 1997 to 2012 in the Kitchener-Waterloo and Cambridge area. James Scott Richardson was the group's most visible member, and in October 2001, police believed that Tri-City Skins had 25 members in southwestern Ontario. Some members of the Tri-City Skins were alleged to have engaged in a campaign of intimidation, assault, vandalism, and other property crimes. Some members have been arrested and charged with possession of illegal weapons and drug possession for the purpose of trafficking.

References

Neo-Nazi organizations
Neo-Nazism in Canada
Organizations established in 1997
Organizations disestablished in 2002
1997 establishments in Ontario
2002 disestablishments in Ontario
Gangs in Ontario